Patriofelis ("father of cats")  was a large, cat-like oxyaenid of middle Eocene in North America. It had short legs with broad feet, suggesting that it may have been a poor runner, but a quite good swimmer. As its close relative Oxyaena was a reasonably good climber, it is possible Patriofelis could climb as well. It is found in particular in the Bridger Basin of southwestern Wyoming and at John Day Fossil Beds National Monument, Oregon, both in the United States.

Phylogeny
The phylogenetic relationships of genus Patriofelis are shown in the following cladogram.

Gallery

See also
 Mammal classification
 Oxyaeninae

References

Oxyaenidae
Eocene mammals of North America
Prehistoric placental genera
John Day Fossil Beds National Monument
Paleogene geology of Oregon
Eocene genus first appearances
Eocene genus extinctions
Taxa named by Joseph Leidy
Fossil taxa described in 1872